In the mathematical field of knot theory, a chiral knot is a knot that is not equivalent to its mirror image (when identical while reversed). An oriented knot that is equivalent to its mirror image is an amphicheiral knot, also called an achiral knot. The chirality of a knot is a knot invariant. A knot's chirality can be further classified depending on whether or not it is invertible.

There are only five knot symmetry types, indicated by chirality and invertibility: fully chiral, invertible, positively amphicheiral noninvertible, negatively amphicheiral noninvertible, and fully amphicheiral invertible.

Background
The possible chirality of certain knots was suspected since 1847 when Johann Listing asserted that the trefoil was chiral, and this was proven by Max Dehn in 1914. P. G. Tait found all amphicheiral knots up to 10 crossings and conjectured that all amphicheiral knots had even crossing number. Mary Gertrude Haseman found all 12-crossing and many 14-crossing amphicheiral knots in the late 1910s. But a counterexample to Tait's conjecture, a 15-crossing amphicheiral knot, was found by Jim Hoste, Morwen Thistlethwaite, and Jeff Weeks in 1998. However, Tait's conjecture was proven true for prime, alternating knots.

The simplest chiral knot is the trefoil knot, which was shown to be chiral by Max Dehn. All nontrivial torus knots are chiral. The Alexander polynomial cannot distinguish a knot from its mirror image, but the Jones polynomial can in some cases; if Vk(q) ≠ Vk(q−1), then the knot is chiral, however the converse is not true. The HOMFLY polynomial is even better at detecting chirality, but there is no known polynomial knot invariant that can fully detect chirality.

Invertible knot
A chiral knot that can be smoothly deformed to itself with the opposite orientation is classified as a invertible knot. Examples include the trefoil knot.

Fully chiral knot
If a knot is not equivalent to its inverse or its mirror image, it is a fully chiral knot, for example the 9 32 knot.

Amphicheiral knot

An amphicheiral knot is one which has an orientation-reversing self-homeomorphism of the 3-sphere, α, fixing the knot set-wise.  
All amphicheiral alternating knots have even crossing number. The first amphicheiral knot with odd crossing number is a 15-crossing knot discovered by Hoste et al.

Fully amphicheiral 
If a knot is isotopic to both its reverse and its mirror image, it is fully amphicheiral. The simplest knot with this property is the figure-eight knot.

Positive amphicheiral 
If the self-homeomorphism, α, preserves the orientation of the knot, it is said to be positive amphicheiral. This is equivalent to the knot being isotopic to its mirror.  No knots with crossing number smaller than twelve are positive amphicheiral and noninvertible .

Negative amphicheiral 

If the self-homeomorphism, α, reverses the orientation of the knot, it is said to be negative amphicheiral.  This is equivalent to the knot being isotopic to the reverse of its mirror image. The noninvertible knot with this property that has the fewest crossings is the knot 817.

References